During the 1968–69 season, Red Star Belgrade participated in the 1968–69 Yugoslav First League, 1968–69 Yugoslav Cup, 1968–69 European Cup and 1968–69 Mitropa Cup.

Season summary
Red Star beat Partizan 6–1 in the 43rd Eternal derby, which remains their biggest victory in the meetings between the two sides.

Squad

Results

Yugoslav First League

Yugoslav Cup

European Cup

Second round

Mitropa Cup

See also
 List of Red Star Belgrade seasons

References

Red Star Belgrade seasons
Red Star
Red Star
Yugoslav football championship-winning seasons